This is a list of the Libya national football team results from 2000 until 2019.

2000

2001

2002

2003

2004

2005

2006

2007

2008

2009

2010

2011

2012

2013

2014

2015

2016

2017

2018

2019

Notes

External links

Wildstat

Results